Strategoconus is a subgenus of sea snails, marine gastropod mollusks in the genus Conus, family Conidae, the cone snails and their allies.

In the latest classification of the family Conidae by Puillandre N., Duda T.F., Meyer C., Olivera B.M. & Bouchet P. (2015), Strategoconus has become a subgenus of Conus as Conus (Strategoconus)da Motta, 1991  (type species:Conus generalis Linnaeus, 1767) represented as Conus Linnaeus, 1758

Species
The following species are alternate representation:
 Strategoconus generalis (Linnaeus, 1767) represented as Conus generalis Linnaeus, 1767 (alternate representation)
 Strategoconus litoglyphus (Hwass in Bruguière, 1792) represented as Conus litoglyphus Hwass in Bruguière, 1792 (alternate representation)
 Strategoconus litteratus (Linnaeus, 1758) represented as Conus litteratus Linnaeus, 1758 (alternate representation)
 Strategoconus maldivus (Hwass in Bruguière, 1792) represented as Conus maldivus Hwass in Bruguière, 1792 (alternate representation)
 Strategoconus monile (Hwass in Bruguière, 1792) represented as Conus monile Hwass in Bruguière, 1792 (alternate representation)
 Strategoconus splendidulus (G.B. Sowerby I, 1833) represented as Conus splendidulus G. B. Sowerby I, 1833 (alternate representation)
 Strategoconus thomae (Gmelin, 1791) represented as Conus thomae Gmelin, 1791 (alternate representation)

References

External links
 To World Register of Marine Species

Conidae
Gastropod subgenera